
Gmina Stara Kamienica is a rural gmina (administrative district) in Jelenia Góra County, Lower Silesian Voivodeship, in south-western Poland.

Neighbouring gminas
Gmina Stara Kamienica is bordered by the towns of Jelenia Góra, Piechowice and Szklarska Poręba, and the gminas of Jeżów Sudecki, Lubomierz and Mirsk.

Villages
The gmina contains the villages of Antoniów, Barcinek, Chromiec, Jaroszyce, Kopaniec, Kopanina, Kromnów, Mała Kamienica, Międzylesie, Nowa Kamienica, Rybnica, Sosnka, Stara Kamienica and Wojcieszyce.

References

Stara Kamienica
Karkonosze County